A windjammer is a commercial sailing ship with multiple masts and rig configurations.

Windjammer or Windjammers may also refer to:

 Iron-hulled sailing ship, often called windjammer

Arts and entertainment
 The Windjammer, a 1926 American silent film starring Billy Sullivan
Windjammer (1930 film), a British film
Windjammer (1937 film), an American film starring George O'Brien
Windjammer (1958 film), a documentary 
Windjammer (album), recorded by jazz trumpeter Freddie Hubbard in 1976
Windjammers (video game), an arcade game

Businesses
Windjammer Barefoot Cruises, a leisure cruise line based in Miami, Florida
Windjammer Communications, a cable company
a division of Valiant Comics created in 1995

Sports teams
Halifax Windjammers, a World Basketball League franchise
Maine Windjammers, a semi-pro basketball team of Portland, Maine
Tampa Bay Windjammers, a team (1996-1999) in the now defunct United States Basketball League

Other uses
Yamaha Windjammer, discontinued EWI
an American term for the button accordion
a brand of motorcycle fairing produced by the Vetter Fairing Company in the 1970s
wind jammer, a protective outer garment designed to be impervious to the wind, a windcheater
a microphone windscreen

See also
Windjammer gas field, a natural gas field off the coast of Mozambique